The EBSA European Snooker Championship is the premier amateur snooker tournament in Europe. The event series is sanctioned by the European Billiards & Snooker Association. It first took place in 1988 and has been held annually since 1993. In most years, the winner of the tournament qualifies for the next two seasons of the World Snooker Tour.

Men's finals

Champions by country

Women's finals

See also
 EBSA European Under-21 Snooker Championships
 EBSA European Under-18 Snooker Championships
 European Masters (snooker)
 World Snooker Tour

References

Snooker amateur competitions
Recurring sporting events established in 1988
1988 establishments in the Netherlands
EBSA Championship
Snooker